The 1964 FA Charity Shield was the 42nd FA Charity Shield, an annual football match played between the winners of the previous season's First Division and FA Cup competitions. The match was played on 15 August 1964 at Anfield, Liverpool and contested by Liverpool, who had won the 1963–64 First Division, and West Ham United, who had won the 1964 FA Cup Final. The teams played out a 2–2 draw and shared the Charity Shield.

Match details

See also
1963–64 Football League
1963–64 FA Cup

References

External links
Score and line-ups
Matchdetails from Liverpool - West Ham United played on Saturday 15 August 1964 - LFChistory - Stats galore for Liverpool FC!
Wayback Machine

1964
Charity Shield 1964
Charity Shield
Comm
Charity Shield
Charity Shield 1966